Dhemaji railway station is a main railway station in Dhemaji district, Assam. Its code is DMC. It serves Dhemaji town. The station consists of two platforms.

Major trains 

 Kamakhya–Murkongselek Lachit Express
 Rangiya–Murkongselek Passenger
 Dekargaon–Murkongselek Passenger

References

Dhemaji
Railway stations in Dhemaji district
Rangiya railway division